Quillcay Machay or Qillqay Mach'ay (Quechua qillqay to write, mach'ay cave, Hispanicized spelling Quillcay Machay) is an archaeological site in Peru. It is situated in the Huánuco Region, Huamalíes Province, Singa District. The site is known for its rock paintings. It was declared a National Cultural Heritage of Peru by Resolución Directoral No. 533/INC on June 18, 2002.

See also 
 Ahuila Gencha Machay
 Pumaj Jirca
 Huata

References 

Archaeological sites in Peru
Archaeological sites in Huánuco Region
Rock art in South America